Ranald George Macdonald (29 August 1788 – 11 March 1873) was a Scottish clan chief and Member of Parliament.

Macdonald was the son of John Macdonald, 18th Chief of Clanranald, by Katherine, the daughter of Robert McQueen, Lord Braxfield.

He became the 19th Chief of Clanranald. He married Caroline Anne, daughter of Richard Edgcumbe, 2nd Earl of Mount Edgcumbe, on 13 February 1812 and had issue.

He was elected to Parliament for Plympton Erle on 10 October 1812 and sat until 1824. In 1824 Alexander Ranaldson MacDonell of Glengarry unsuccessfully attempted to deprive Macdonald of the chiefship of Clan Donald by bringing an action in the Court of Session.

Between 1813 and 1838, Clanranald sold almost the entirety of his estates. He attributed his financial misfortune to peculation on the part of his trustees.  However, the historical consensus has been that his ruin resulted primarily from his folly and extravagance.

References
 

1788 births
1873 deaths
UK MPs 1812–1818
UK MPs 1818–1820
UK MPs 1820–1826
Scottish clan chiefs
Ranald George
Members of the Parliament of the United Kingdom for Plympton Erle
Clanranald, Ranald George Macdonald, 6th Baron
19th-century British businesspeople